Sotiris Amarianakis  (born ) is a former Greek male volleyball player. He was part of the Greece men's national volleyball team that won the bronze medal at the 1987 European Championship in Belgium. He played for Greek powerhouse Olympiacos for 8 years (1988–96), winning numerous titles.

Clubs
  Esperos Vyzantiou (1980-1985)
  PAOK Thessaloniki V.C. (1985-1988)
  Olympiacos (1988-1996)
  Ktisifon Paianias (1996-1997)
  Filia Ilioupolis (1997-1998)
  Ionikos Nikaias (1998-2002)
  AEK V.C. (2002-2003)

References

1965 births
Living people
Greek men's volleyball players
Olympiacos S.C. players
PAOK V.C. players
Volleyball players from Thessaloniki